James Bellamy (1819–1909) was a British academic and administrator at the University of Oxford.

Bellamy was educated at Merchant Taylors' School and St John's College, Oxford, where he graduated BA in 1841 and MA in 1845. He was ordained in 1843 and was awarded a Bachelor of Divinity in 1850 followed by a Doctor of Divinity in 1872. He was President of St John's College from 1871 to 1909.

At Oxford University, Bellamy was a member of the University Commission from 1877 to 1879 and Vice-Chancellor from 1886 to 1890. He was also a conservative and musician.

See also
 List of Vanity Fair (British magazine) caricatures

References

Further reading
 
 

1819 births
1909 deaths
People educated at Merchant Taylors' School, Northwood
Alumni of St John's College, Oxford
Fellows of St John's College, Oxford
Presidents of St John's College, Oxford
Vice-Chancellors of the University of Oxford